is a railway station in the city of Ashikaga, Tochigi, Japan, operated by the East Japan Railway Company (JR East).

Lines
Tomita Station is served by the Ryōmō Line, and is located 31.1 km from the terminus of the line at Oyama Station.

Station layout
Tomita Station has one side platform (platform 1) and an island platform connected to the station building by a footbridge. The track for the former platform 3 has been removed.

Platforms

History

Tomita Station opened on 18 February 1893. With the privatization of JNR on 1 April 1987, the station came under the control of JR East. A new station building was completed in March 1999.

Passenger statistics
In fiscal 2016, the station was used by an average of 1049 passengers daily (boarding passengers only).

Surrounding area
 Tomita Post Office
 Kurita Museum

See also
 List of railway stations in Japan

References

External links

 JR East Station information 

Railway stations in Tochigi Prefecture
Ryōmō Line
Stations of East Japan Railway Company
Railway stations in Japan opened in 1893
Ashikaga, Tochigi